Arbëri is an Albanian surname. It may refer to the following family of Albanian football players:
Arben Arbëri (born 1964)
Klodian Arbëri (born 1979) 
Theodhor Arbëri (born 1953), brother of Arben and Klodian, father of Polizoi and Gersi
Gersi Arbëri (born 1983), son of Theodhor
Polizoi Arbëri (born 1988), son of Theodhor

Albanian-language surnames